Surgeon-General Cosmo Gordon Logie FRSE (1820–1886) was a military surgeon and medical author of Scots descent in the 19th century.

Life 
He was born in Bengal in India on 25 August 1820, the son of Elizabeth Sophia (née Arnold), daughter of Sir John Arnold, and Lt Col William Logie of Speymouth.

He was sent home to Scotland to study and trained in medicine at the University of Edinburgh graduating MD in 1840. He followed in his father's footsteps and joined the British Army as an Assistant Surgeon to the Rifle Brigade in 1841. In 1862 he became Surgeon Major to the Royal Horse Guards.

In 1871 he was elected a Fellow of the Royal Society of Edinburgh, his proposer was Alexander Hamilton LLB.

He retired in 1875 at the rank of Deputy Surgeon General and died at Paddington in London on 6 April 1886.

Publications

On the Cattle Disease (1866)
The Causes of the Premature Decline of the Cavalry Soldier (1869)

Family

He married Mary Maria Kean (1843–1898) the daughter of the eminent actor Charles John Kean in 1876, when he was 54 and she was 33. Together they had a son Charles Harry Gordon Logie (1877–1897). He had two illegitimate children prior to his marriage, Cosmo Gordon Logie Smail (1856–1908) to a Ms Smail; and Charles Arnold Boswell (born 1860) to Isabella Boswell.

References

1820 births
1886 deaths
Alumni of the University of Edinburgh
19th-century British medical doctors
British Army regimental surgeons
Fellows of the Royal Society of Edinburgh
Royal Army Medical Corps officers
British Army brigadiers
Rifle Brigade officers
Royal Horse Guards officers
6th (Inniskilling) Dragoons officers